This article lists important figures and events in Malaysian public affairs during the year 1990, together with births and deaths of notable Malaysians.

Incumbent political figures

Federal level
Yang di-Pertuan Agong: Sultan Azlan Shah
Raja Permaisuri Agong: Tuanku Bainun
Prime Minister: Dato' Sri Dr Mahathir Mohamad
Deputy Prime Minister: Dato' Ghafar Baba
Lord President: Abdul Hamid Omar

State level
 Sultan of Johor: Sultan Iskandar
 Sultan of Kedah: Sultan Abdul Halim Muadzam Shah
 Sultan of Kelantan: Sultan Ismail Petra
 Raja of Perlis: Tuanku Syed Putra
 Sultan of Perak: Raja Nazrin Shah (Regent)
 Sultan of Pahang: Sultan Ahmad Shah
 Sultan of Selangor: Sultan Salahuddin Abdul Aziz Shah
 Sultan of Terengganu: Sultan Mahmud Al-Muktafi Billah Shah
 Yang di-Pertuan Besar of Negeri Sembilan: Tuanku Jaafar (Deputy Yang di-Pertuan Agong)
 Yang di-Pertua Negeri (Governor) of Penang: Tun Dr Hamdan Sheikh Tahir
 Yang di-Pertua Negeri (Governor) of Malacca: Tun Syed Ahmad Al-Haj bin Syed Mahmud Shahabuddin
 Yang di-Pertua Negeri (Governor) of Sarawak: Tun Ahmad Zaidi Adruce Mohammed Noor
 Yang di-Pertua Negeri (Governor) of Sabah: Tun Said Keruak

Events
1 January – The introduction of unleaded petrol in Malaysia. 
1 January – Visit Malaysia Year 1990 officially began.
1 January – Dataran Merdeka (formerly Padang Kelab Selangor) was officially opened.
2 January – The Amanah Saham Bumiputra (ASB) scheme launched.
28 February – 17 people including 11 Federal Reserve Unit (FRU) riot police personal were killed in a collision between FRU riot police vehicles, tankers lorry, a passenger bus and ten cars at kilometre 31 of the Kuala Lumpur-Karak Highway not far from Genting Sempah Tunnel in Gombak, Selangor.
14 May – Kuala Lumpur celebrated 100 years of local authority. The new federal territory of Kuala Lumpur flag and anthem were introduced. 
29 May – Tun Hussein Onn, Malaysia's 3rd prime minister died. His body was interred  at Makam Pahlawan, near Masjid Negara, Kuala Lumpur.
1 June – The first Non-Aligned Summit Meeting G15 held in Kuala Lumpur
2 June – P. Ramlee awarded the Darjah Panglima Setia Mahkota (DPSM) highest award with a title Tan Sri 
2 July – A stampede inside a pedestrian tunnel (Al-Ma'aisim Tunnel) leading out from Mecca towards Mina and the Plains of Arafat led to the deaths of 1,426 pilgrims including 122 Malaysians. 
11 July – Malaysia Agriculture Park (Taman Pertanian Malaysia), Bukit Cahaya Seri Alam opened to the public.
3 August – Proton Saga with Megavalve engine is launched.
1 September – The Lembaga Letrik Negara (National Electricity Board) (LLN) was incorporated as Tenaga Nasional Berhad (TNB). 
17 October – The Communist insurgency in Sarawak was officially over. The peace treaty between Malaysia government and the second bureau of the North Kalimantan Communist Party was signed in Kuching, Sarawak.
21 October – The Malaysian General Elections. Kelantan now led by the PAS party.
1 November – South Africa's anti-apartheid leader, Nelson Mandela began a four-day visit to Malaysia.
6 December – Tunku Abdul Rahman Putra Al-Haj, the first Malaysian Prime Minister, also known as the "Father of Malayan Independence" or "Father of Malaysia" died. His body was brought back to Kedah and laid to rest at Kedah Royal Mausoleum, Langgar.

Births
 27 February – Hafiz Suip – Singer
 14 March – Siti Saleha – Actress
 15 March – Muhammad Ziyad Zolkefli  – Shot Putter 
21 March – Ahmad Aminuddin Shaharuddin – Football player
16 April – Cheong Jun Hoong – Diver
2 June – Izzue Islam – Actor and singer
30 June – Bryan Nickson Lomas – Diver
5 July – Tunku Abdul Jalil ibni Sultan Ibrahim Ismail – Tunku Laksamana of Johor (died 2015)
18 July – Mohd Azniee Taib – Football player
2 August – Juzzthin – Actor and singer
13 August – Shila Amzah – Singer
18 August – Stracie Angie Anam (Stacy) – Singer
14 September – Fattah Amin – Actor
19 September – Alif Satar – Singer
24 December – Tengku Amir Shah – Raja Muda of Selangor
30 December – Nik Shahrul Azim Abdul Halim – Football player
 9 October – Hanis Zalikha  – Actress, TV host and blogger

Deaths
29 May – Tun Hussein Onn – Third Malaysian Prime Minister, also known as the "Father of Unity" (born 1922)
29 August – Chin Fung Kee, civil engineer (born 1920)
6 December – Tunku Abdul Rahman Putra Al-Haj – First Malaysian Prime Minister, also known as "Father of Malayan Independence" or "Father of Malaysia"

See also 
 1990
 1989 in Malaysia | 1991 in Malaysia
 History of Malaysia

 
Malaysia
Years of the 20th century in Malaysia
1990s in Malaysia
Malaysia